Xaphan: Book of Angels Volume 9 is an album by the Secret Chiefs 3 performing compositions from John Zorn's second Masada book, "The Book of Angels". It is the fifth studio album to be released by the Secret Chiefs 3. As with the other volumes of the Book of Angels series, the titles of the songs are characters from Jewish and Christian mythology. The title of the album, Xaphan refers to one of the fallen angels who rebelled with Satan and set the Heaven on fire.

Reception

The Scene Point Blank review by Kevin Fitzpatrick stated "Spruance is a noted perfectionist and as such, surrounds himself with great musicians he can count on to deliver the goods. This will always be a good thing and with Xaphan showcasing the likes of Tim Smolens and Ches Smith, you can pretty much guarantee an album of substance, worth, and beauty that has become a cornerstone of both Zorn and Spruances work throughout their career".

Track listing

Personnel
 Trey Spruance — guitars (baritone guitar, electric guitar, bass guitar), piano, organ, percussion, autoharp, synthesizer, production, recording, mixing
 Anonymous 13 — voice, viola
 Chippy (Heung-Heung Chin) — design
 Rich Doucette — sarangi
 Timb Harris — violin, trumpet
 Scott Hull — audio mastering
 Shahzad Ismaily — bass guitar
 Jai Young Kim — B3 organ
 Justin Phelps — mixing
 Jason Schimmel — guitar, recording
 Monica Schley — harp
 Ches Smith — drums, congas
 Tim Smolens — cello, upright bass, recording
 Kazunori Sugiyama — associate producer
 Adam Stacey — clavinet
 Arun Venkatesh — recording
 Alex Eddings — Assistant Engineer 
 John Zorn — executive producer

Footnotes

External links
[ Xaphan: Book of Angels Volume 9] at Allmusic
Xaphan at Masada World
 – Secret Chiefs 3 perform the music of Xaphan in this live recording
 – Secret Chiefs 3 perform the music of Xaphan in this live recording

2008 albums
Albums produced by Trey Spruance
Book of Angels albums
Tzadik Records albums
Secret Chiefs 3 albums